The Halifax Fisheries Commission was a joint international tribunal created by the Governments of the United Kingdom and the United States in 1877 under Articles 22 and 23 of the Treaty of Washington (1871). The purpose of the Commission was to determine the amount of compensation, if any, to be paid by the United States to the United Kingdom under Article 18 of the Treaty, in return for fishing privileges for Americans in the Atlantic waters off Canada and Newfoundland.

Representatives
The Commission was composed of three members. The British Government appointed Sir Alexander Tilloch Galt as the British representative on the Commission. The United States appointed Ensign H. Kellogg as the American representative. The third member and chair of the Commission was M. Maurice Delfosse, the Belgian Minister to the United States, who was appointed by the Austro-Hungarian Ambassador to the United Kingdom.

Sir Francis Clare Ford was the Agent representing the British Government. Dwight Foster was the Agent representing the Government of the United States.

Counsel for the British government were:

 Joseph Doutre, Q.C. of Montreal, Quebec;
 Sir R. Thompson, Q.C. of Saint John, New Brunswick;
 Hon. W.V. Whiteway, Q.C., of St. John's, Newfoundland;
 Hon. Louis H. Davies, of Charlottetown, Prince Edward Island;
 R.L. Weatherbe, Q.C., of Halifax, Nova Scotia.

William Henry Trescot and Richard Henry Dana, Jr. served as counsel for the United States before the Commission.

Outcomes
On 23 November 1877, the Commission gave its decision. The Commission split, 2-1. The majority, composed of M. Delfosse and Sir Alexander Galt, ruled in favour of the British Government and held that the United States was to pay the British Government $5,500,000, in gold, as compensation for American fishing rights in British North American waters. The American Commissioner, Mr. Kellogg, dissented, stating that in his opinion the Treaty conferred greater advantages on the British Government than those conferred on the American Government. He also questioned whether the Commission could render a binding decision unless it was unanimous. Mr Foster, the American Agent, then registered a formal protest against the non-unanimous award.

In spite of the dissent by the American Commissioner and the protest by the American Agent, the United States duly paid the award of $5,500,000, by means of the American Minister to the United Kingdom, John Welsh.

When the treaty was later denounced by the United States, negotiations had to be resumed and a new treaty was signed in 1888.

The Treaty and the Commission were notable steps in the recognition of Canada as a self-governing dominion within the British Empire. Although the Commission was formally set up by the United Kingdom and the United States, the British Commissioner and four of the five counsel representing the British government were Canadian, the fifth counsel being a Newfoundlander.

References

External links 
 Record of the Proceedings of the Halifax Fisheries Commission
 Treaty of Washington (1871)
 Halifax Fishery Commission, Library and Archives Canada

Canada–United States relations
United Kingdom–United States relations
History of fishing
History of the Atlantic Ocean
1877 establishments
Newfoundland (island)
International nongovernmental organizations
Quasi-judicial bodies
Governance of the British Empire
International courts and tribunals
History of Halifax, Nova Scotia
1877 in the British Empire
1877 in the United States
1877 in international relations